The Order of Cultural Merit (Hangul: 문화훈장) is one of South Korea's orders of merit. It is awarded by the President of South Korea for "outstanding meritorious services in the fields of culture and art in the interest of promoting the national culture and national development."

Grades
The Order of Cultural Merit is conferred in five grades.

Recipients

Geumgwan (Gold Crown), 1st Class
 Myung-whun Chung, 1996
 Shin Sang-ok, 2006
 Nam June Paik, 2007
 Yu Hyun-mok, 2009
 Park Wan-suh, 2011
 Youn Yuh-jung, 2021
 Song Hae, 2022 (posthumous)
Lee Jung-jae, 2022
Hwang Dong-hyuk, 2022

Eungwan (Silver Crown), 2nd Class
 Martina Deuchler, 1995
 Lee Mi-ja, 2009
 Kun-Woo Paik, 2010
 Lee Soo-man, 2011
 Shin Young-kyun, 2011
 Ha Chun-hwa, 2011
 Kim Ki-duk, 2012
 Kim Soo-hyun, 2012
 Kim Ku-lim, 2017
 Cho Yong-pil, 2013
 Gu Bong-seo, 2013
 Ahn Sung-ki, 2013
 Patti Kim, 2013
 Park Jung-ran, 2014
 Song Hae, 2014
 Choi Bul-am, 2014
 Lee Soon-jae, 2018
 Kim Min-ki, 2018
 Bong Joon-ho, 2019
 Kim Hye-ja, 2019
  Yang Hee-eun, 2019
 Ryu Je-dong, 2020
 Go Doo-shim, 2020
 Byun Hee-bong, 2020
 Yoon Hang-gi, 2020
 Han Cheol-hee, 2021
 Lee Jang-hee, 2021
 Lee Choon-yeon, 2021
 Park Chan-wook, 2022
 Kang Soo-yeon, 2022

Bogwan (Precious Crown), 3rd Class
 Hai-Kyung Suh, 1980
 Yanagi Sōetsu, 1984
 Park Chan-wook, 2004
 Shin Goo, 2010
 Go Eun-jung, 2010
 Im Hee-chun, 2010
 Shin Jung-hyeon, 2011
 Oh Seung-ryong, 2011
 Yoo Ho, 2011
 Lee Ho-jae, 2011
 Na Moon-hee, 2012
 Song Chang-sik, 2012
 Choi Eun-hee, 2014
 Kim Su-il, 2014
 Myung Kook-hwan, 2014
 Kadir Topbaş, 2014
 Kim Young-ok, 2018
 Im Ha-ryong, 2020
 Song Jae-ho, 2021
 Park In-hwan, 2021
 Noh Hee-gyeong, 2021
 Song Kang-ho, 2022
 Park Jin-sook, 2022 
 Huh Young-man, 2022

Okgwan (Jeweled Crown), 4th Class
 Kang Soo-yeon, 1987
 Moon So-ri, 2002
 Choi Min-sik, 2004 — Choi Min-sik returned the decoration badge in 2006, protesting large cuts in support programs for the arts programs of the Korean government.
 Lee Byung-hoon, 2006
 Jeon Do-yeon, 2007
 Anthony Graham Teague, 2008
 Park Jae-sang (Psy), 2012
 Lee Jung-jin, 2012
 Jo Min-su, 2012
 Song Kang-ho, 2019

Hwagwan (Flower Crown), 5th Class
 Ji-young Kim, 1998
 Bae Yong-joon, 2008
 BTS, 2018: Kim Nam-joon (RM), Kim Seok-jin (Jin), Min Yoon-gi (Suga), Jung Ho-seok (J-Hope), Park Ji-min, Kim Tae-hyung (V) and Jeon Jung-kook

Class unknown
 Samuel Martin, 1994

Notes

References

Bibliography
 Korean Overseas Information Service. (1997) A Handbook of Korea, 6th edition. Seoul, Korea: Seoul International Publishing House.

External links

Cultural Merit, Order